The 2010 Florida Gators softball team represented the University of Florida softball program for the 2010 NCAA softball season.

Previous season
The 2009 Gators went 63-5 overall and 26-1 in SEC play. They were named the #1 overall seed in the NCAA tournament for the second straight year, advanced to the championship series of the Women's College World Series. They also were the SEC regular season and tournament champions. Five Gators were named All-Americans (Stacey Nelson, Stephanie Brombacher, Aja Paculba, Francesca Enea, and Kelsey Bruder) and Senior pitcher Stacey Nelson was again named the SEC Pitcher of the Year.

Pre-season
The Gators returned 10 members from the 2009 squad and added 7 freshmen.  All-time Florida home run leader Francesca Enea and undefeated right-handed pitcher Stephanie Brombacher returned to lead the team.  The SEC Media selected Florida to win the SEC East and finish second to Alabama for the conference title.  Brombacher, Bruder, Enea, and Paculba were voted to the pre-season All-SEC team.

Schedule

|-
!colspan=9| USF Wilson-DeMarini Tournament

|-
!colspan=9|

|-
!colspan=9| Lipton Invitational

|-
!colspan=9|

|-
!colspan=9| DeMarini Tournament

|-
!colspan=9|

|-
!colspan=9| SEC tournament

|-
!colspan=9| NCAA tournament

Game notes

East Carolina (USF Wilson-DeMarini Tournament)

In the Gators' opening game of the 2010 season, three homers scored all four of their runs.  Kelsey Bruder, Francesca Enea, and Brittany Schutte hit home runs for Florida in the second, third and fourth innings, respectively.  East Carolina made the game uncomfortable in the fifth when, trailing 4-1, Marina Gusman-Brown hit a 2-RBI double to left field to bring the Pirates within a run.  However, freshman pitchers Ensley Gammel and Erin Schuppert kept the East Carolina bats quiet for the remaining 2.1 innings, allowing only one base-runner.

Georgia Tech (USF Wilson-DeMarini Tournament)

The Gators left eight runners on base, seven in the first three innings, in the game and failed to score.  Francesca Enea led Florida from the plate with a 2-for-3 performance at the plate.  Georgia Tech broke up the scoreless game in the bottom of the 5th when Jessica Sinclair doubled to center and Kate Kuzma tripled to bring her home.  Jen Yee tripled to lead off the sixth for the Yellow Jackets, and Hope Rush homered bringing the margin to three.  The loss was the first of Stephanie Brombacher's Gator career.

South Florida (USF Wilson-DeMarini Tournament)

After leading by eight runs in the fifth inning, the Gators allowed the Bulls to come back into the game with a one-out grand slam.  Stephanie Brombacher walked in a run before allowing the four additional runs.  Then, in the sixth inning, South Florida strung together five hits to score three more runs.  With two on and two outs, JoJo Medina doubled to right center, scoring both runners aboard.  Back-to-back singles scored Medina before a line out ended the inning.
Florida scored in every inning but the fifth, finally giving their pitchers some run support after struggling to get runners home in their first two games.  In the top of the first, Francesca Enea sent the first pitch she saw over the wall in left field to score both Aja Paculba and Brittany Schutte, who were both walked to lead off the game.  In the second inning, Enea scored Schutte, who reached on an error, with an RBI double.  Enea moved to third on a passed ball and scored on a groundout by Kelsey Bruder.  With one out in the next frame, Megan Bush and Michelle Moultrie reached base via a walk and a bunt single, respectively.  Paculba singled to score them both.  In the fourth, Tiffany DeFelice walked and scored on an RBI double from Corrie Brooks.  Enea walked and Bruder singled to lead off the sixth inning.  After DeFelice laid down a sacrifice bunt to move pinch runner Lauren Heil and Bruder over, Brooks advanced them both another bag with a fielder's choice which did not result in an out.  A Bush sacrifice fly scored Bruder, and a single from Moultrie scored Brooks.  In the final inning, up only three, the Gators scored one last insurance run.  Schutte walked with one out and moved to second on a ground out by Enea.  She would score on the next pitch, which Bruder sent up the middle.

Long Island (USF Wilson-DeMarini Tournament)

Long Island got on the board first in the bottom of the first.  With two on base via the walk, Ensley Gammel gave up an RBI single to Emily Kakuska.  Erin Schuppert, who relieved Gammel after she loaded in the bases, allowed another RBI single, but Francesca Enea kept a third run from scoring with a perfect throw home.  Florida and Long Island traded zeros until the top of the fourth, when Corrie Brooks hit a solo homer to center.  The Gators tied it with another solo home run two innings later, this time by Brittany Schutte.  In the final frame, Florida took the lead with an RBI double by Aja Paculba.  With two on and one out, Schutte drew a walk to load the bases for Enea, who promptly homered to give the Gators a 7-2 lead.

Campbell (Lipton Invitational - Game 4)

Kansas (Lipton Invitational - Game 5)

Marshall (Lipton Invitational - Game 7)

East Carolina (Lipton Invitational - Game 8)

East Carolina (Lipton Invitational - Game 12)

Northwestern State (Game 1)

Northwestern State (Game 2)

Northwestern State (Game 3)

Pacific (DeMarini Tournament)

Stanford (DeMarini Tournament)

Cal State Fullerton (DeMarini Tournament)

UC Davis (DeMarini Tournament)

Loyola Marymount (DeMarini Tournament)

Ole Miss (Game 1)

Ole Miss (Game 2)

Ole Miss (Game 3)

Auburn (Game 1)

Auburn (Game 2)

South Florida

Alabama (Game 1)

Alabama (Game 2)

Alabama (Game 3)

UCF

LSU (Game 1)

LSU (Game 2)

LSU (Game 3)

Arkansas (Game 1)

Arkansas (Game 2)

Arkansas (Game 3)

Ranking Movement

Roster
The 2010 Florida Gators softball team has 2 seniors, 5 juniors, 3 sophomores, and 7 freshmen.

Coaching staff
Head coach: Tim Walton (5th season)
Assistant Coaches: Jennifer Rocha (5th season), Jenny Gladding (4th season)
Volunteer Coach: Coy Adkins (1st season)
Athletic Trainer: Eric King
Student Trainer: Melissa Rosen
Strength & Conditioning Coordinator: Steven Orris
Academic Counselor: Tony Meacham
Program Coordinator: Brittany Souilliard
Managers: Alex Dorsh, Melissa Howell, and David Lopez

See also
Florida Gators softball

References

Florida Gators softball seasons
Florida Gators softball team
Florida Gators softball team
Women's College World Series seasons
2010 NCAA Division I softball tournament participants